Caroline of Hesse-Homburg (1771–1854) was a Princess regent of Schwarzburg-Rudolstadt between 1807 and 1814.

Life
She was the daughter of Frederick V, Landgrave of Hesse-Homburg and his wife, Caroline of Hesse-Darmstadt. She married in 1791 to Louis Frederick II, Prince of Schwarzburg-Rudolstadt. They had seven children together. 

She was regent of Schwarzburg-Rudolstadt during the minority of her son Friedrich Günther, Prince of Schwarzburg-Rudolstadt. 

Caroline died on 20 June 1854.

Children

Ancestry

References 

1771 births
1854 deaths
House of Hesse-Homburg
Princesses of Schwarzburg
Daughters of monarchs
19th-century women rulers